Danielle Claudine Ortega Garcia-Crawford (born September 24, 1992), known professionally as Coleen Garcia (is a Filipino actress, host, and model. Garcia started her career as a child and teenager appearing in several commercials. She was eventually signed by Star Magic, where she has starred in several television series and films produced by ABS-CBN. From 2012 to 2016, she co-hosted the channel's noontime variety show It's Showtime, which she had left to focus solely on her acting career. Garcia's lead roles include the films Ex with Benefits (2015), Love Me Tomorrow (2016), and Sin Island (2018), as well as the teleseryes Pasión de Amor (2015–2016) and Ikaw Lang ang Iibigin (2017–2018).

Early life
Garcia was born in Mandaluyong to a Spanish Filipino father, Jose Luis García, and Filipino mother, Maria Paz Ortega. Her paternal family is based in Barcelona. Garcia studied at the Southville International School and Colleges. She also took up college in Southville where she is taking up psychology through blended learning. Garcia is a third cousin of actor Arjo Atayde and actress Ria Atayde.

Career

Early beginnings
Garcia started as a commercial model as early as age 2, when she and her mom appeared in a commercial for Johnson & Johnson. At nine years old, she was an image model for Just G, the teens line for Gingersnaps. From 2009 to 2011, a teenage Garcia starred in several commercial endorsements. Some of those advertisements include Skin White alongside John Lloyd Cruz, Lewis & Pearl cologne alongside Enrique Gil, and Nestea alongside Neil Coleta as Matina.

2011–present: Breakthrough
Garcia has been under contract with ABS-CBN's Star Magic group of talents since 2011. She first appeared in the episode "School I.D." of the anthology series Maalaala Mo Kaya, and was cast alongside ex-Lewis & Pearl partner Enrique Gil and former Pinoy Big Brother: Teen Clash 2010 contestants James Reid, Devon Seron, Fretzie Bercede and Yen Santos in a teen-oriented show Good Vibes.  She also made appearances in other ABS-CBN shows and teleseryes such as My Binondo Girl, Wansapanataym, Oka Tokat, Little Champ, among others. In 2012, Garcia became a co-host for the noontime variety show It's Showtime. In 2013, she starred in her first feature film, She's the One.

In 2014, Garcia was cast in a supporting role in the Gino M. Santos-directed independent film #Y. She played an extroverted adolescent named Janna, for which being part of the cast garnered her a Best Cast Ensemble citation at the 10th Cinemalaya Independent Film Festival.

In June 2015, Garcia joined the main cast of the teleserye Pasión de Amor, an adaptation of the 2003 Colombian telenovela Pasión de Gavilanes, starring alongside Jake Cuenca, Arci Muñoz, Ejay Falcon, Ellen Adarna, and Joseph Marco. The series ran for almost nine months, ending in February 2016. In September, Garcia earned her first lead role in a feature film in the erotic film Ex with Benefits, reuniting with Santos and starring opposite Derek Ramsay. While it was a box office success, the film received criticism from the medical community for misrepresentation of the profession, where Garcia plays a medical representative. Garcia responded that her role was more focused on highlighting "her individual flaws" rather than being a generalization of the profession.

In January 2016, she announced that she had departed It's Showtime to prioritize her acting career. Later that year, she starred in an episode of Maalaala Mo Kaya entitled "Kadena". Her role as a mentally ill teenager was praised by critics and audiences for her portrayal of the character's several mental illnesses as a result of alcoholism and drug abuse, including auditory hallucination, antisocial personality disorder, and epilepsy. Garcia's performance in Maalaala Mo Kaya earned her the Best Actress award at the Hiyas ng Sining Awards organized by the Guild of Educators, Mentors, and Students. In 2017, Garcia starred in the action-comedy film Extra Service, alongside Jessy Mendiola and her Pasión de Amor co-star Arci Muñoz. From May 2017 to January 2018, she starred as Isabel Reyes in Ikaw Lang ang Iibigin, reuniting with Cuenca.

Garcia collaborated with Santos for another erotic film, Sin Island, in 2018, with Xian Lim as her on-screen partner. In an interview, she revealed that she suffered a face injury during filming that was accidentally inflicted upon by her co-star Nathalie Hart.

She appeared in the 2020 romantic comedy film Mia, playing the titular lead role of a doctor who resorted to alcoholism after the death of her fiancé.

Personal life
Garcia had a relationship with golfer Miguel "Mikey" Punsalan from 2008 to 2010.

Garcia dated Good Vibes co-star Enrique Gil from 2010 to 2011.

In 2014, Garcia began dating her It's Showtime co-host, Billy Crawford. The two became engaged on December 20, 2016, and married on April 20, 2018. Her cousin Ria Atayde served as her maid of honor during the wedding. On May 1, 2020, Garcia and Crawford announced on Instagram that they were expecting their first child. Their son, Amari, was born in September 2020 via water birth.

In October 2020, Garcia's half-sister through her father was born, nearly a month after the birth of her own son.

Filmography

Television

Film

Awards and nominations

References

External links

1992 births
Living people
Filipino female models
Filipino film actresses
Filipino people of Spanish descent
Filipino television actresses
Filipino television variety show hosts
People from Mandaluyong
Actresses from Metro Manila
21st-century Filipino actresses
Filipina gravure idols
Ilocano people
ABS-CBN personalities
Star Magic
Viva Artists Agency